Transfiguration(s) or The Transfiguration may refer to:

Religion 
 Transfiguration of Jesus, an event in the Bible
 Feast of the Transfiguration, a Christian holiday celebrating the Transfiguration of Jesus
 Transfiguration (religion), a momentary transformation of a person into some aspect of the divine

Paintings
 Transfiguration (Bellini, Venice), c. 1454–1460
 Transfiguration of Christ (Bellini), c. 1480
 Transfiguration (Lotto), c. 1510—1512
 Transfiguration Altarpiece (Perugino), 1517
 Transfiguration (Pordenone), c. 1515–1516
 Transfiguration (Raphael), c. 1516–1520
 Transfiguration (Rubens), 1604–1605
 Transfiguration (Savoldo), c. 1530

Film and television
 The Transfiguration (film), a 2016 American film
 Transfiguration (Harry Potter), a subject taught at Hogwarts in Harry Potter media
 "Transfigurations", a 1990 episode of Star Trek: The Next Generation

Literature
 Transfigurations (novel), a 1979 novel by Michael Bishop

Music
 Transfiguration (album), by Artemiy Artemiev and Peter Frohmader, 2002

Songs
 "Transfiguration", by Aghora from the album Aghora, 2003
 "Transfiguration", by Dave Fitzgerald from Lux Aeterna, 1997
 "Transfiguration", by Hillsong Worship from Open Heaven / River Wild , 2015
 "Transfiguration", by Your Memorial from Redirect, 2012
 "Transfiguation #1" and "Transfiguration #2", by M. Ward from Transfiguration of Vincent, 2003
 "The Transfiguration", by Sufjan Stevens from Seven Swans, 2004

See also
 Church of the Transfiguration (disambiguation), including uses of Transfiguration Church and other variants
 Transfiguration Cathedral (disambiguation)